Jarius Wright (born November 25, 1989) is a former American football wide receiver. He was drafted by the Minnesota Vikings in the fourth round of the 2012 NFL Draft. He played college football for the University of Arkansas Razorbacks, where he was an All-SEC first-team selection in 2011.

Early years
Wright attended Warren High School in Warren, Arkansas, where he participated in football, basketball, baseball, and track and was teammates with Greg Childs and Chris Gragg. He was an All-State choice during his junior season when he finished with 51 receptions, 1,086 yards and 15 touchdowns to go with 5 more scores on kick and punt returns. As a senior in 2007, he was named to the All-State team and the All-Arkansas team by the Arkansas Democrat-Gazette after racking up 58 receptions for 1,350 yards and 15 touchdowns and returning 3 kicks for touchdowns. He also earned a spot on the Associated Press (AP) Super Team.

In track & field, Wright scored eighth in the 55-meter dash at the 2007 Arkansas 1A-4A Indoor State Championships, and set a personal-best time of 6.79 seconds in the preliminary rounds. In addition, he also owned a 4.4-second 40-yard dash.

Regarded as a four-star recruit by Rivals.com, Wright was ranked as the No. 218 player in the nation, as well as the No. 18 wide receiver and No. 3 player in the state of Arkansas. Wright chose Arkansas over scholarship offers from Oklahoma, Tennessee and Mississippi, among others.

College career
Wright played college football for the University of Arkansas Razorbacks from 2008 to 2011, and was an All-SEC first-team selection as a senior in 2011. He appeared in 50 games during his Arkansas career, making 44 starts and missing only one game during his career. He ranks first in the school's record books in receptions (168) and receiving yards (2,934), and also ranks 5th all-time in SEC history in receiving yards. His 24 career receiving touchdowns ranks 2nd in school history and tied for 15th in SEC history. He had 9 100+ yard games, which tied for second in program history.

In 2009, Wright was named Arkansas’ Outstanding Offensive Player in the Liberty Bowl against East Carolina when he had 4 catches for 90 yards and 1 touchdown.

He hauled in a career long 89-yard score in 2010 versus Mississippi State.

Wright set single-season records for Arkansas as a senior in 2011 with 66 receptions, 1,117 yards and 12 touchdowns despite missing one game. He was named SEC Co-Offensive Player of the Week after torching Texas A&M with 13 receptions for 281 yards and 2 touchdowns; the 281 yards was 2nd in SEC history and an Arkansas single-game record, and the 13 receptions tied the record for receptions in a game. For his play, he was a first-team All-SEC selection. He helped Arkansas to an 11-2 overall record in 2011, win the Cotton Bowl over Kansas State 29-16, and finish ranked #5 in the final polls.

Professional career

Pre-draft

Minnesota Vikings
On April 28, 2012, Wright was selected by the Minnesota Vikings in the fourth round (118th overall) of the 2012 NFL Draft, joining former college and high school teammate Greg Childs in the Vikings 2012 draft class, selected 16 spots later (#134 overall). He was the first of three Vikings picks in the 4th Round of the 2012 NFL Draft. He made his NFL debut against the Detroit Lions on November 11, 2012, catching three passes from quarterback Christian Ponder for 65 yards and a touchdown. He had the 2 longest catches by Vikings during his rookie season in 2012 with 65 and 54-yarders. He helped set a Vikings record when five rookies started a game vs. the Chicago Bears on November 25, joining Matt Kalil, Rhett Ellison, Josh Robinson, and Harrison Smith.

2012 season
As a rookie in 2012, Wright hauled in two touchdowns on the season to lead Vikings rookies. He played in final seven regular season games and the Wild Card playoff at Green Bay with one start in the regular season against the Chicago Bears. He reeled in the two longest passes on the Vikings season with a 65 yarder against the Green Bay Packers and a 54-yarder against the Detroit Lions. His first NFL reception in his first game was a 54-yard strike from Christian Ponder against the Detroit Lions. He had a career-high seven catches in his second career game, a road game against the Chicago Bears. He scored his first career touchdown on a 3-yarder from Ponder against the Detroit Lions. In the regulars season finale, he hauled in an eight-yard touchdown against the Green Bay Packers.

2013 season
In 2013, Wright scored a new career-high with 3 touchdowns, including 2 against the eventual Super Bowl champion Seattle Seahawks top-ranked defense and the first one a 38-yard touchdown burning first-team all-pro corner Richard Sherman. He hauled in a career-long 95 receiving yards in an upset win over the playoff-bound Philadelphia Eagles. His lone catch at Cincinnati was a 36-yard touchdown pass from Matt Cassel. He started in the season finale game vs. the Detroit Lions, the final game at the Mall of America Field. He started against the Seattle Seahawks in place of injured Greg Jennings, reeling in a career-best pair of touchdown catches, a 38-yarder from Christian Ponder and a 21-yarder from backup Matt Cassel. He had a season-high 3 catches vs. the Cleveland Browns.

2014 season
In 2014, Wright had the best season of his career, posting career-highs in starts (7), receptions (42), receiving yards (588) and first downs (25). He also had two touchdown receptions, including one on a screen pass from Teddy Bridgewater that he took 87 yards for a game-winning overtime touchdown on December 7 against the New York Jets. That was the longest reception of his career and the 2nd longest in the NFL that season.

2015 season
On September 10, 2015, Wright signed a four-year contract extension with the Vikings worth $14.8 million, including $7 million guaranteed. The contract began in 2016, after the end of Wright's rookie deal, and would’ve kept him with the team through 2019. He logged 34 catches for 442 yards in 16 games with 3 starts. He topped 50 yards receiving twice in three weeks after posting 5 catches for 51 yards against the Arizona Cardinals and 3 catches for a season-high 57 yards in the Vikings' blowout win over the New York Giants on December 27. He notched a career-long 29-yard carry on a reverse run at Detroit in week 2. He also recorded a 52-yard catch against the Kansas City Chiefs in week 6, the second straight year he has posted the Vikings season-long reception.

2016 season
In 2016, Wright played in only eight games, recording a career-low 11 receptions for 67 yards and one touchdown.

2017 season
In 2017, Wright played in 16 games, recording 18 receptions for 198 yards and two touchdowns.

On March 16, 2018, Wright was released by the Vikings.

Carolina Panthers

On March 20, 2018, Wright signed a two-year contract with the Carolina Panthers, reuniting with former Vikings offensive coordinator, Norv Turner. In the 2018 season, he had 43 receptions for 447 yards and one touchdown. He returned to play in 2019 with 296 yards receiving, and a full 16 game season for Carolina. Wright had consecutive years of appearing in every regular season game for the Panthers.

NFL career statistics

Personal life
Wright studied sociology at the University of Arkansas and was named to the Razorback Honor Roll in the fall of 2011 based on his performance in the classroom. He sponsors an AAU basketball team in his hometown. He also sponsors ussa tourney boys baseball in Warren. He is also an avid outdoorsman, enjoys fishing, hiking and boating. His father, Joe Wright, is a retired Arkansas state trooper and Army reservist. His mother, Jeanette Wright, is a retired elementary school teacher.

References

External links
 
 Carolina Panthers bio
 Arkansas Razorbacks bio

1989 births
Living people
American football wide receivers
Arkansas Razorbacks football players
Carolina Panthers players
Minnesota Vikings players
People from Warren, Arkansas
Players of American football from Alabama